Craig Cwm Silyn is a mountain in Snowdonia, North Wales which forms the highest point on the celebrated Nantlle Ridge.

The steep northern face is popular with climbers. To the west the Nantlle Ridge continues over Garnedd Goch and ends at Mynydd Graig Goch. To the east the ridge dips down to 515m before rising up to Mynydd Tal-y-mignedd, Trum y Ddysgl, Mynydd Drws-y-coed and ending at Y Garn in Nantlle. The views are extensive, offering a 360-degree panorama.

References

Hewitts of Wales
Marilyns of Wales
Mountains and hills of Snowdonia
Nuttalls
Mountains and hills of Gwynedd
Dolbenmaen
Llanllyfni